The Archdeacon of Emly was a senior ecclesiastical officer in the Diocese of Emly and its successor amalgamated dioceses. 

Notable archdeacons included Garrett FitzGerald, Archdeacon 1615-38, John Hickey, Archdeacon for more than 40 years until his death in 1723, Edward Moore (Archdeacon 1782-1788), Charles Agar (died 1789), John Jebb, later Bishop of Limerick, Ardfert and Aghadoe, who was Archdeacon  1821-3, and Henry Irwin, Archdeacon 1843-1858.

Notes